The 1984 Virginia Slims Championships were the thirteenth WTA Tour Championships, the annual tennis tournament for the best female tennis players in singles on the 1983 WTA Tour. It was the 13th edition of the tournament and was held from February 28 through March 4, 1984 at the Madison Square Garden in New York City, United States. First-seeded Martina Navratilova won the singles title.

Champions

Singles

  Martina Navratilova defeated  Chris Evert-Lloyd, 6–3, 7–5, 6–1
 It was Navratilova's 2nd singles title of the year and the 88th of her career.

Doubles

  Martina Navratilova /  Pam Shriver defeated  Jo Durie /  Ann Kiyomura, 6–3, 6–1

Prize money

* per team

See also
 Evert–Navratilova rivalry

Notes

References

External links
 
 WTA tournament draw (PDF)
 ITF tournament edition details

WTA Tour Championships
Virginia Slims Championships
Virginia Slims Championships
Virginia Slims Championships
1980s in Manhattan
Virginia Slims Championships
Virginia Slims Championships
Madison Square Garden
Sports competitions in New York City
Sports in Manhattan
Tennis tournaments in New York City